Pearcy may refer to:

Pearcy, Arkansas, an unincorporated community

People with the surname
Carl Pearcy, American mathematician
George Pearcy (1919–1992), American basketball player
George Etzel Pearcy (1905–2008), American geographer
Henry Pearcy (1922–2002), American basketball player
Patricia Pearcy (born 1940), American actress
Stephen Pearcy (born 1956), American musician
Stephen Pearcy (activist) (born 1960), American attorney and activist

See also
Pearcy v. Stranahan, U.S. Supreme Court case (1907)